Simwonsa is a Buddhist temple of the Jogye Order in Seongju-gun, North Gyeongsan, South Korea.

History 
Simwonsa Temple (Korean: 심원사, Chinese: 深源寺, Pronounced “Seem-won-sa”) is thought to have been established around the 8th century. The above poem written by Yi Sung-in  describes it as an ancient temple, so it is thought to have existed long before the Goryeo era.

One record says the temple was renovated by Ven. Jiwon during the reign of Joseon's King Jungjong (r. 1506-1544), but Simwonsa Temple was reduced to ashes during the Japanese invasion (1592-1597). Beomugo (Temple Directory of Joseon), published in 1799, describes it as abandoned and so it seems likely to have already been in ruins in the 18th century. It was reconstructed in 2003 as part of Seongju County's project, “Restoration Plan of Cultural Tourism Resources in the Region of Mt. Gayasan National Park.”

In preliminary excavation surveys, it was confirmed that Simwonsa Temple had been a typical United Silla era mountain temple. It had three Buddha halls built above four-story terraced retaining walls and its land measured 80 meters (262 feet) north to south and 100 meters (328 feet) east to west. Among the artifacts discovered were a pedestal for a stone Buddha statue, a salutation stone, a nimbus from a Buddha statue, a seated stone Vairocana Buddha statue, and a stone that was part of the base of a stone pagoda. All of these collectively are designated Cultural Heritage Materials of North Gyeongsang Province No. 525.

Sinwonsa temple in poetry

Cultural properties 
Although Simwonsa Temple was recently restored after a long period of abandonment, there remained the Three-Story Stone Pagoda (Cultural Heritage Material of North Gyeongsang Province No. 116),  and a Woodblock for Choosing Auspicious and Inauspicious Days (Treasure No. 1647). Inscribed at Buseoksa Temple in Yeongju during the reign of Goryeo's King Gojong (r. 1122-1146), this printing woodblock lists special days.

Many temple ruins are scattered around the area: the Beopsusa Temple Ruins (another great temple of the Silla era), Yonggisa Temple Ruins, Iryoam Hermitage Ruins and a temple ruin at Baegun-ri.

Gallery

References

External links
 Simwonsa official website(in Korean)

Buddhist temples of the Jogye Order
Buddhist temples in South Korea